Los de Abajo is a football supporters group at Universidad de Chile.

Los de Abajo may also refer to:

 Los de Abajo (band), a Mexican band
 Los de abajo (film), 1940 Mexican film directed by Chano Urueta
 Los de abajo (novel), 1915 novel by Mariano Azuela

See also
 Arriba los de abajo (Above those who are below), 1998 musical work by Juan María Solare
 The Underdogs (disambiguation)